Mozambique is divided into 10 provinces (províncias) and 1 capital city (cidade) with provincial status:

See also
List of provinces of Mozambique by Human Development Index
Districts of Mozambique
ISO 3166-2:MZ

External links
 Provinces of Mozambique, Statoids.com

References

 
Subdivisions of Mozambique
Mozambique, Provinces
Mozambique 1
Provinces, Mozambique
Mozambique geography-related lists